The Black Path may refer to:

The Black Path (book), a novel by Asa Larsson
The Black Path (album), an album by Emil Bulls
Black Path